The 12th People's Choice Awards, honoring the best in popular culture for 1985, were held in 1986. They were broadcast on CBS.

Winners

Favorite New Song:
"We Are the World"

Favorite New TV Dramatic Program:
Dynasty II - The Colbys

Favorite All-Around Female Entertainer:
Barbara Mandrell,
Meryl Streep

Favorite All-Around Male Entertainer:
Bill Cosby

Favorite Country Music Performer:
Kenny Rogers

Favorite Male Musical Performer:
Bruce Springsteen

Favorite Female Musical Performer:
Madonna

Favorite Male TV Performer:
Bill Cosby

Favorite Motion Picture:
Back to the Future

Favorite Motion Picture Actress:
Meryl Streep

Favorite Female Performer in a New TV Program:
Cybill Shepherd

Favorite New TV Comedy Program:
The Golden Girls

Favorite Female TV Performer:
Linda Evans

Favorite TV Dramatic Program:
Dynasty,
Miami Vice

Favorite Young TV Performer:
Emmanuel Lewis

Favorite Classical Music Performer:
Luciano Pavarotti

Favorite TV Comedy Program:
The Cosby Show

Favorite Male Performer in a New TV Program:
Bruce Willis

Favorite Motion Picture Actor:
Sylvester Stallone

References

People's Choice Awards
1985 awards
1986 in American television
1985 awards in the United States
March 1986 events in the United States